Javier Tapia (born 1957) is a Peruvian artist and painter.

Biography 
Javier Tapia was born in 1957 in Lima, Peru, and grew up in a period of upheaval when guerrilla warfare dominated political and social movements across the country. He moved to the United States in the 1980s, witnessing various phases of humanity: good and evil, intellectual and primitive, connected and separate. Tapia takes these studio themes as abstract shapes and broad strokes to serve as a metaphor for chaos and control, or structure and disorder. In the tradition of the Peruvian Textile, he overlaps, subtracts, and reworks the watercolors, flipping the paper out as bold colors emerge like carvings. The active ingredients emit physically; Work becomes energetic, on the verge of chaos, but organized in the constraints of paperwork. He currently lives in Richmond, Virginia and works in the Virginia Commonwealth University's Faculty of Painting and Print Production, where he has been teaching since 1988.

Education 
From 1984 to 1987, Tapia studied at the University of Texas at Austin, where he earned his Bachelor of Fine Arts and Master of Fine Arts and was a recipient of a Presidential Scholarship.

In 2015, Tapia worked as an associate professor in the Faculty of Fine Arts and Typography at Virginia Commonwealth University.

In 2019, Tapia joined the staff of Virginia Commonwealth University. The school has also exhibited the department's art to view Javier's work.

Artworks

Exhibitions 

Tapia does not have a specific collection because he also collaborates with other artists on numerous exhibitions. He has more exhibited at the Embassy Art Gallery of Peru, Washington, DC; Museo de Osma, Barranco, Peru; Bloom Galleries, Milan, Italy; Hunt Galleries at Mary Baldwin College, Staunton, Virginia; 1708 Gallery, and Anderson Gallery, both, Richmond, Virginia. With him he participated in the Strategies in Contemporary Art of the Americas in Vincent Price Art Museum exhibition. along with colleagues whose works are tied to the legacy of colonialism and challenge the dominant, accepted stories.

Books

Bibliography 
Tapia, Javier, and Museo Pedro De Osma. "Javier Tapia En El Museo Pedro De Osma : Acuarelas : 6 De Julio-6 De Agosto Del 2000". Lima, Perú: Museo Pedro De Osma, 2000. Last modified August 6, 2000. https://primo.getty.edu/permalink/f/19q6gmb/GETTY_ALMA21133183980001551

Tapia, Javier. "The Schooling of Puerto Ricans: Philadelphia's Most Impoverished Community." Anthropology & Education Quarterly 29, no. 3 (1998): 297-323. Last modified September 1, 1998. https://imf-primo.hosted.exlibrisgroup.com/permalink/f/1thbp2d/TN_cdi_crossref_primary_10_1525_aeq_1998_29_3_297

Amano-Dolan, Christina. "VCUarts professor accused of racial profiling will not return to teaching this year". The Common Wealth Times. Last Modified August 21, 2019. https://commonwealthtimes.org/2019/08/21/vcuarts-professor-accused-of-racial-profiling-will-not-return-to-teaching-this-year/

References

External links 
 Exhibitions of Javier Tapia
 Javier Tapia by Art in Embassies

1957 births
Living people
Watercolorists
Peruvian artists
Peruvian painters
Peruvian male painters
People from Lima
Peruvian emigrants to the United States
People from Richmond, Virginia
University of Texas at Austin alumni
Virginia Commonwealth University faculty